Battle of Borneo may refer to two battles or campaigns of World War II:

Battle of Borneo (1941-42)
Borneo campaign (1945)